Gerze may refer to:

Gerze, Turkey, district in Turkey
Gêrzê County, Ngari Prefecture, Tibet Autonomous Region, China (Tibet)